The Goalkeeper is a 2000 Spanish drama film directed by Gonzalo Suárez which stars Carmelo Gómez as the title character alongside Maribel Verdú and Antonio Resines.

Plot 
The plot follows the mishaps of Ramiro Forteza, a goalie arriving to an Asturian village in 1948, coming to acquaint both with the Guardia Civil and the Maquis.

Cast

Production 
The screenplay was penned by Gonzalo Suárez alongside , based on an original story by Hidalgo.

Set to start filming, Suárez announced his film to be primarily a western ("although it will also have that perverse mix of genres that I like so much").

Release 
Distributed by Lolafilms Distribución, the film was theatrically released in Spain on 8 September 2000.

Reception 
Jonathan Holland of Variety deemed the film to be "an accomplished, surprisingly low-key historical piece", with "a strong, high-profile cast of solid pros" breathing "convincing life into a delicate, resonant and surprisingly contemporary little parable",  otherwise with the director's "tendency toward the histrionic" being "kept under control".

Accolades 

|-
| rowspan = "2" align = "center" | 2001 || rowspan = "2" | 15th Goya Awards || Best Actor || Carmelo Gómez ||  || rowspan = "2" | 
|-
| Best Adapted Screenplay || Manuel Hidalgo, Gonzalo Suárez || 
|}

See also 
 List of Spanish films of 2000

References 

Films set in Asturias
2000s Spanish films
2000s Spanish-language films
LolaFilms films
Spanish drama films
2000 drama films
Spanish association football films
Films about the Spanish Maquis
Films set in 1948
Spanish historical drama films
Films shot in Asturias
Films directed by Gonzalo Suárez